Antoine Brice (26 May 1752, in Brussels, Austrian Netherlands – 23 January 1817, in Brussels, United Kingdom of the Netherlands) was a painter from Brussels.

Life 
Antoine Brice was the son of the painter Pierre-François Brice, working in the entourage of Prince Charles Alexander of Lorraine, and his own son Ignace also became a painter.  Antoine began his training as a painter under his father at the Brussels Court and was made a master by the Corporation of Painters of Brussels on 5 February 1783.  In the meantime he had also followed a more classical training at the Academy of Painting, Sculpture and Architecture of Brussels, where he won first prize in 1776.  This training and the entourage of the governor-general's court led him, at the end of the 18th century and the end of the Austrian regime in Brussels, to become a kind of official painter to the city's aristocratic circles.

He became a professor at the Brussels academy and there headed a course on classical art and the principals of drawing.  His students included Jean Baptiste Madou.  In 1810 he joined with the painters Antoine Cardon, Charles Verhulst and François-Joseph Navez to found a "Société des Amateurs d'Arts".

1752 births
1817 deaths
Artists from Brussels
Belgian painters
Draughtsmen